Are You Human? is a 2018 South Korean television series starring Seo Kang-joon and Gong Seung-yeon. It aired on KBS2's Mondays and Tuesdays at 22:00 (KST) time slot, from June 4 to August 7, 2018.

Synopsis
Oh Laura, a renowned scientist, was forced to part with her young son, Nam Shin. To cope with her loss, over the years, she builds various AI robots modelled after him, naming them Nam Shin I, II and III. Decades later, after surviving an attempt on his life, Nam Shin slips into a coma. To protect his position as the heir to a chaebol, Laura sends Nam Shin III to take his place and fulfil his duties.

Kang So-bong was a member of Nam Shin's security detail until she was dismissed in disgrace. She becomes Nam Shin III's bodyguard, determined to get to the bottom of his strange comments and behaviour. However, she gets more than what she'd bargained for when she starts falling for him - and has to keep him safe from the very people who'd tried to murder Nam Shin.

Cast

Main
 Seo Kang-joon as Nam Shin / Nam Shin III
 A third generation heir who falls into coma after an unexpected accident. His mother Oh Laura, an authority on brain science and artificial intelligence leads the creation of an android, Nam Shin III, in a bid to maintain his position as heir to a chaebol conglomerate.
 Gong Seung-yeon as Kang So-bong
 A former MMA fighter who had to quit due to an injury from competition, and then worked as a bodyguard. She comes to protect Nam Shin III, and although she does it out of selfish motive at first, she later comes to care for him genuinely. 
 Lee Joon-hyuk as Ji Young-hoon 
 Nam Shin's secretary and only friend and a guardian. A pragmatic and realistic person. His background is tied to Nam Shin's company, PK Group, in that he was raised in an orphanage that the conglomerate funded, and went on to become a top student at a university also backed by PK Group.
 Park Hwan-hee as Seo Ye-na 
 Nam Shin's fiancée. Her father is a high-level director at PK Group and Nam Shin's opponent.
 Kim Sung-ryung as Laura Oh 
 Nam Shin's mother and an expert in the field of intelligence. Described as intelligent and intensely focused, she's also the lead researcher working on developing the android with a secret team of top scientists.
 Yu Oh-seong as Seo Jong-gil
 Nam Shin's opponent, Seo Ye-na's father. A high-level director of PK group who wants to become the head of the company.
 Park Yeong-gyu as Nam Gun-ho
 Nam Shin's grandfather. CEO of PK group. A sly and cunning man.

Supporting
 Choi Deok-moon as David 
 Kim Hye-eun as Nam Ho-yeon 
 Seo Eun-yool as No Hee-dong
 Kim Won-hae as Kang Jae-sik
 Kim Hyun-sook as Reporter Jo
 Oh Hee-joon as Jo In-tae
 Cha Yub as Robo Cop
 Chae Dong-hyun as Ko Chang-jo
 Cha In-ha as Hwang Ji-yong
 Cho Jae-ryong as Secretary Park 
 Choi Byung-mo as Choi Sang-guk
 Oh Eui-shik as Cha Hyun-joon
 Oh Han-kyul as young Nam Shin/A.I. robot Nam Shin I	
 Lee Joo-chan as teen Nam Shin/A.I. robot Nam Shin II
 Oh Joo-eun as Team Leader

Special appearances
 Heo Young-ji (Ep. 1)
 Kim Seung-soo as Nam Jung-woo, Nam Shin's father

Production
 The series is written by Jo Jung-joo (The Princess' Man, 2011) and directed by Cha Young-hoon (Uncontrollably Fond, 2016).
 The first script reading was held in June 2017 at KBS Annex in Yeouido, Seoul. 
 Filming began in late June 2017 and wrapped up on November 29, 2017. Some parts of the filming took place in Czech Republic. 
 The entire series production has taken two years to complete which had cost a total of 10 billion won (US$9.23 million).
 Go A-ra was offered the role of the female lead but declined.
 The drama was screened at the Cannes International Series Festival prior to its premiere.

Original soundtrack

Part 1

Part 2

Part 3

Part 4

Part 5

Part 6

Part 7

Part 8

Part 9

Ratings
 In this table,  represent the lowest ratings and  represent the highest ratings.
 NR denotes that the drama did not rank in the top 20 daily programs on that date.

Awards and nominations

Notes

References

External links
  
 
 
 

Korean Broadcasting System television dramas
South Korean romance television series
2018 South Korean television series debuts
Korean-language television shows
Television series about robots
Television series by KBS Media
South Korean science fiction television series
South Korean pre-produced television series
2018 South Korean television series endings